

References

Bushfire seasons in Australia
Australian bushfire season
Australian bushfire season
Australian bushfire season 
Australian bushfire season
Bush 
Bush